Simone Signoret (born Simone Henriette Charlotte Kaminker; 25 March 1921 – 30 September 1985) was a  French actress. She received various accolades, including an Academy Award, three BAFTA Awards, a César Award, a Primetime Emmy Award, and the Cannes Film Festival Award for Best Actress, in addition to nominations for two Golden Globe Awards.

Early life 
Signoret was born Simone Henriette Charlotte Kaminker in Wiesbaden, Germany, to Georgette (née Signoret) and André Kaminker. She was the eldest of three children, with two younger brothers. Her father, a pioneering interpreter who worked in the League of Nations, was a French-born army officer from a Polish Jewish and Hungarian Jewish family, who brought the family to Neuilly-sur-Seine on the outskirts of Paris. Her mother, Georgette, from whom she acquired her stage name, was a French Catholic.

Signoret grew up in Paris in an intellectual atmosphere and studied English, German and Latin. After completing secondary school during the Nazi occupation, Simone was responsible for supporting her family and forced to take work as a typist for a French collaborationist newspaper, Les nouveaux temps, run by Jean Luchaire.

Career 
During the occupation of France, Signoret mixed with an artistic group of writers and actors who met at the Café de Flore in the Saint-Germain-des-Prés quarter. By this time, she had developed an interest in acting and was encouraged by her friends, including her lover, Daniel Gélin, to follow her ambition. In 1942, she began appearing in bit parts and was able to earn enough money to support her mother and two brothers as her father, who was a French patriot, had fled the country in 1940 to join General De Gaulle in England. She took her mother's maiden name for the screen to help hide her Jewish roots.

Signoret's sensual features and earthy nature led to type-casting and she was often seen in roles as a prostitute. She won considerable attention in La Ronde (1950), a film which was banned briefly in New York as immoral. She won further acclaim, including an acting award from the British Film Academy, for her portrayal of another prostitute in Jacques Becker's Casque d'or (1951). She appeared in many French films during the 1950s, including Thérèse Raquin (1953), directed by Marcel Carné, Les Diaboliques (1954), and The Crucible (Les Sorcières de Salem; 1956), based on Arthur Miller's The Crucible.

In 1958, Signoret acted in the English independent film,  Room at the Top (1959), from which her emotionally powerful performance won her numerous awards including the Best Female Performance Prize at Cannes and the Academy Award for Best Actress. Not for nearly 40 years did another French actress receive an Oscar: Juliette Binoche  (Supporting Actress, 1997) and Marion Cotillard (Best Actress, 2008). She was offered films in Hollywood, but turned them down for several years, continuing to work in France and England—for example, opposite Laurence Olivier in Term of Trial (1962). She earned a further Oscar nomination for her work on Ship of Fools (1965), and appeared in a few other Hollywood films before returning to France in 1969.

In 1962, Signoret translated Lillian Hellman's play The Little Foxes into French for a production in Paris that ran for six months at the Theatre Sarah-Bernhardt. She played the Regina role as well. Hellman was displeased with the production, although the translation was approved by scholars selected by Hellman.

Signoret's one attempt at Shakespeare, performing Lady Macbeth opposite Alec Guinness at the Royal Court Theatre in London in 1966 proved to be ill-advised, with some harsh critics; one referred to her English as "impossibly Gallic".

Signoret was never concerned with glamour, ignored sexist and ageist insults and continued giving finely etched performances. She continued to appear in many movies before her death in 1985.

Personal life 
Signoret's memoirs, Nostalgia Isn't What It Used To Be, were published in 1978. She also wrote a novel, Adieu Volodya, published in 1985, the year of her death.

Signoret first married filmmaker Yves Allégret (1944–49), with whom she had a daughter Catherine Allégret, herself an actress. Her second marriage was to the Italian-born French actor Yves Montand in 1951, a union which lasted until her death; the couple had no children.

Signoret died of pancreatic cancer in Autheuil-Authouillet, France, aged 64. She was buried in Père Lachaise Cemetery in Paris and Yves Montand was later buried next to her.

Filmography

Awards and nominations

Popular culture 
Marilyn (2011) by Sue Glover, premiered at the Citizens' Theatre, Glasgow on 17 February 2011. The play charted the deteriorating relationship between Signoret and Marilyn Monroe during the filming of Let's Make Love. Unable to achieve the recognition of Oscar-winning Signoret, Monroe begins an affair with Signoret's husband, Yves Montand.
  Singer Nina Simone (Born Eunice Waymon) took her last name from Simone Signoret.

See also 

 Cinema of France
 César Award for Best Actress
 List of actors with two or more Academy Award nominations in acting categories
 List of French Academy Award winners and nominees

Notes

References

Bibliography 

 DeMaio, Patricia A. "Garden Of Dreams: The Life of Simone Signoret," 2014
 Monush, Barry (ed). The Encyclopedia of Hollywood Film Actors From the Silent Era to 1965. New York: Applause Books, 2003. .
 Signoret, Simone. Nostalgia Isn't What It Used To Be. London: Weidenfeld and Nicolson, 1978. .

External links 

Simone Signoret at The-Numbers.com
Simone Signoret at Find A Grave

1921 births
1985 deaths
20th-century French actresses
20th-century memoirists
Actresses from Paris
Best Actress Academy Award winners
Best Actress César Award winners
Best Foreign Actress BAFTA Award winners
Burials at Père Lachaise Cemetery
Cannes Film Festival Award for Best Actress winners
David di Donatello winners
Deaths from cancer in France
Deaths from pancreatic cancer
French communists
French film actresses
French stage actresses
French television actresses
French people of Polish-Jewish descent
French memoirists
People from Wiesbaden
Outstanding Performance by a Lead Actress in a Miniseries or Movie Primetime Emmy Award winners
Silver Bear for Best Actress winners
German emigrants to France